Dustin Sheehan Lyman (born August 5, 1976) is an American business executive and former  American football tight end in the National Football League (NFL).  Lyman is the current President and GM of Copper Mountain Ski Resort in Colorado and former Chief Executive Officer of Famous Brands International. He was selected in the third round of the 2000 NFL Draft out of Wake Forest University by the Chicago Bears with whom he played for five seasons.

References

External links
Wake Forest profile

1976 births
Living people
Sportspeople from Boulder, Colorado
Players of American football from Colorado
American football linebackers
American football tight ends
Wake Forest Demon Deacons football players
Chicago Bears players
Ed Block Courage Award recipients